Title 24 of the United States Code outlines the role of hospitals and psychiatric hospitals in the United States Code.

 —Navy Hospitals, Army and Navy Hospital, and Hospital Relief for Seamen and Others
 —Soldiers and Airmens Home
 —National Home for Disabled Volunteer Soldiers
 —Saint Elizabeths Hospital
 —Columbia Institution for the Deaf
 —Freedmens Hospital
 —National Cemeteries
 —Private and Commercial Cemeteries
 —Gorgas Hospital
 —Hospitalization of Mentally Ill Nationals Returned From Foreign Countries
 —Armed Forces Retirement Home

External links
U.S. Code Title 24, via United States Government Printing Office
U.S. Code Title 24, via Cornell University

Title 24
24